This list of museums and colleges includes locations exhibiting mastodon fossils.

Austria

Canada

Germany

Italy

Japan

United Kingdom

United States

Alabama

Arkansas

California

Connecticut

Florida

Idaho

Illinois

Indiana

Maine

Massachusetts

Maryland

Michigan

Missouri

Nebraska

New Jersey

New York

North Dakota

Ohio

Oregon

Pennsylvania

Tennessee

Texas

Washington

Washington, D.C.

Wisconsin

References

Mastodons
Pleistocene proboscideans
Natural history museums in the United States
Mastodon fossils